Deva Manikya (d. 1563), also spelt Deb Manikya, was the Maharaja of Tripura from 1520 to 1530. A son of the famous Dhanya Manikya, Deva initially continued his father's legacy of military conquests, though he ultimately proved to be less successful. A religiously zealous monarch, he was eventually killed in a conspiracy orchestrated by his spiritual guru.

Reign
Deva Manikya, likely a younger son of Dhanya Manikya, succeeded to the throne after the death of his elder brother Dhwaja Manikya in 1520. That same year, he invaded and conquered the Bhulua Kingdom, located in what is now the Bangladeshi district of Noakhali. The city of Sonargaon was similarly captured and Deva is also believed to have held sway over Chittagong. However, his victories proved to be ephemeral since his rival, Sultan Nasrat Shah of Bengal, soon recaptured the latter region. It is also apparent that Sonargaon too was lost at some point, given that Deva's son celebrated his own conquest of the territory years later.

He was a deeply devout individual and followed the Shaktism tradition of Hinduism. After his conquests in Bhulua and Chittagong, Deva made a pilgrimage to the spring at Durasara (located in present-day Sitakunda) and performed a holy bath, striking coins to commemorate the event. One story relates that he once offered slaves as a sacrifice to the Fourteen Gods. However, when he was informed by the head priest that Mahadeva demanded an offering of the best commanders of the army, Deva had eight of his generals immolated as well.

Deva eventually became a disciple of a Tantric Maithil Brahmin named Lakshminarayana, who launched a conspiracy against him in 1530. He was eventually assassinated by Lakshminarayana, who had worked in collaboration with one of his queens. Deva's son by this queen, Indra Manikya II, was placed on the throne, though the Brahmin held the actual power in the kingdom. This continued until 1532, when Lakshminarayana was killed and the throne was taken by Deva's younger son, who became Vijaya Manikya II.

References

Kings of Tripura
History of Tripura
Murdered Indian monarchs
16th-century murdered monarchs
1530 deaths
Murder in 1530